{{DISPLAYTITLE:Xi2 Canis Majoris}}

Xi2 Canis Majoris, which is Latinized from ξ2 Canis Majoris, is an astrometric binary star system in the southern constellation of Canis Major. With an apparent visual magnitude of +4.54, it is visible to the naked eye. It is receding with a radial velocity of +26 km/s.

The binary nature of this system was determined based on changes in the proper motion of the visible component. Buscombe (1962) gave the white-hued primary a stellar classification of A0 V, indicating it is an A-type main-sequence star. However, Houk and Smith-Moore (1978) list it with a class of A0 III, which would match a more evolved giant star, also of the A-type. It is 339 million years old with a high rate of spin, having a projected rotational velocity of 145 km/s. The star is radiating 224 times the Sun's luminosity from its photosphere at an effective temperature of 8,799 K.

References

A-type main-sequence stars
A-type giants
Astrometric binaries
Canis Majoris, Xi2
Canis Major
Durchmusterung objects
Canis Majoris, 05
046933
031416
2414